AJHS may refer to:

Abraham Joshua Heschel School
American Jewish Historical Society
Auburn Junior High School
Australian Jewish Historical Society